As of the end of 2014, solar power in Austria amounted to 766 megawatt (MW) of cumulative photovoltaic (PV) capacity, of which more than three quarters were installed within the last four years. Solar PV generated 766 gigawatt-hours, or about 1.4% of the country's final electricity consumption. As with most other European countries, 99.5 percent of all solar power systems are connected to the electrical grid. The nation's installed PV capacity by inhabitant (watt-peak per capita) stood at 91 watts, still below the European Union's 2014-average of 172 watts.

Photovoltaic deployment in Austria had been rather modest for many years, while in other European countries, such as Germany, Italy and Spain, installations were booming with new records year after year. However, in an overall declining European solar market, annual PV deployment jumped beyond 100 megawatt in 2012 and remained above that level at 263 MW and 140 MW for 2013 and 2014, respectively. The European Photovoltaic Industry Association forecasts, that Austria, together with other mid-sized countries, will contribute significantly to European PV deployment in the coming years.

In 2009, the site of Zwentendorf power station became Austria's largest solar power station with an investment of 1.2 million Euro, with the addition of 1,000 photovoltaic panels. Zwentendorf was intended to be Austria's first nuclear power plant, but after a vote in 1978 prohibiting nuclear power in Austria, was never completed. In September, 2011, Austria's largest solar power station, 2 MW, was under construction in the Niedere Tauern mountain range.

Austria has also a large capacity of solar heating at its disposal. With more than 3,500 MWthermal the country ranks second in the EU, only behind much larger Germany.

Photovoltaic installations

Statistics

See also 

Solar power in the European Union
Wind power in Austria
List of renewable energy topics by country

References

External links 
Monitored PV installations in Austria